Ernest Harold Pickering (1881 – 31 January 1957) was a British Liberal Member of Parliament for the Leicester West constituency. He was also Professor of English Literature at Tokyo University.

Background
He was born in Leicester.

Professional career
Pickering was a Unitarian Minister. He was author of A Brief Survey of English Literature. He was Professor of English at Yamagata, Koto Gakko, Japan. He was Professor of English Literature at Tokyo University.

Political career
He was Liberal candidate for the Leicester West division at the 1931 General Election. Following the formation of the National Government, the Conservatives and Liberals agreed not to oppose each other in Leicester and as part of that arrangement, Pickering was given a free run against his Labour opponent. He managed to gain the seat. In parliament, Pickering took the official Liberal whip and sat on the government benches until the Liberal Party moved into opposition in 1933. He did not defend his seat at the 1935 General Election. He did not contest the 1945 General Election. He was Liberal candidate for the Newark division of Nottinghamshire at the 1950 General Election. He did not stand for parliament again.

Electoral record

References

External links 

1881 births
1957 deaths
Liberal Party (UK) MPs for English constituencies
UK MPs 1931–1935